Canada Water bus station serves the Surrey Quays area of the London Borough of Southwark, London, England. The station is owned and maintained by Transport for London.

The bus station was opened on 18 September 1999 at the same time as the Jubilee line extension to Stratford reached Canada Water and is accessible by escalator from Canada Water station below easily. It is very near to Surrey Quays Shopping Centre. There is one alighting stand and four boarding stands within the bus station.

The glass-roofed bus station was designed by Eva Jiřičná. It is a hub for services in the Rotherhithe and Bermondsey areas as well as an interchange for the tube station. Its most distinctive feature is a row of 16 m (52 ft)-long roof spans cantilevered from a row of central columns supporting a 100 m (330 ft)-long glass and aluminium canopy. This provides acoustic protection to the surrounding residential blocks and shelters passengers waiting below from the elements.

See also
List of bus and coach stations in London

References

External links
 Buses from Canada Water and Surrey Quays - Transport for London

Bus stations in London
Transport in the London Borough of Southwark
Surrey Quays